Twentymile Creek is a tributary of Lake Erie in  Chautauqua County, New York and Erie County, Pennsylvania in the United States.

Twentymile Creek joins Lake Erie near the community of Orchard Beach, Pennsylvania.

Twentymile Creek is considered the largest stream on the eastern portion of the City of Erie.  It is stocked annually with steelhead and trout by the Pennsylvania Fish Commission.  Twentymile Creek is an approved trout water, so its fishing can be good throughout the year.  Steelhead run into Twentymile all the way to New York, but not many anglers venture up that far to fish.  New York State has undertaken efforts to stock brown trout in the upper reaches of Twentymile as well. The brown trout migrate out into Lake Erie and return to spawn.  Access points along Route 20 are posted.

See also
List of rivers of New York
List of rivers of Pennsylvania

References

Rivers of New York (state)
Rivers of Pennsylvania
Tributaries of Lake Erie
Rivers of Chautauqua County, New York
Rivers of Erie County, Pennsylvania